Premishlan can mean one of the following:

 Premishlan - a Yiddish name for the city of Peremyshlyany in Lviv province of western Ukraine
 Premishlan (Hasidic dynasty) - a Hassidic dynasty that originates from Peremyshlyany city